The 1807 Tennessee gubernatorial election took place from August 6–7, 1807. Sevier won his final term as governor of Tennessee with 85.80% of the vote against Senator William Cocke.

Results

References

gubernatorial
1807
Tennessee